Raymond Vincent "Nig" Borleske (January 8, 1887 – January 2, 1957) was an American professional baseball player and college football player and coach. Borleske was one of a number of American athletes in the first half of the 20th century to be nicknamed "Nig", being referred to as such in newspaper reports as early as September 1907.

Borleske was born in Albert Lea, Minnesota. He played college football for the Fighting Missionaries of Whitman College in Walla Walla, Washington, from 1907 to 1909. He played in minor league baseball from 1910 to 1912, pitching for two teams in the Western Canada League. He served as the head football coach at Whitman College from 1915 to 1946.

Borleske was the mayor of Walla Walla from 1948 to 1954. He died in Walla Walla on January 2, 1957, of a heart attack.  He was the manager of the Marcus Whitman Hotel there at the time of his death. Borleske's brother, Stanley Borleske, was also a college athlete and coach.

References

External links
 
 

1887 births
1957 deaths
American football halfbacks
Baseball pitchers
Brandon Angels players
Whitman Blues men's basketball coaches
Whitman Fighting Missionaries football coaches
Whitman Fighting Missionaries football players
Mayors of places in Washington (state)
Politicians from Walla Walla, Washington
People from Albert Lea, Minnesota
Players of American football from Spokane, Washington
Baseball players from Spokane, Washington
Basketball coaches from Washington (state)